Zahir Ali (born August 25, 1987 in Jakarta) is an Indonesian racing driver. He has competed in such series as the All-Japan Formula Three Championship and the German Formula Three Championship. He raced for A1 Team Indonesia at two rounds in the 2008–09 A1 Grand Prix season.

References

External links
 

1987 births
Living people
Indonesian racing drivers
A1 Team Indonesia drivers
Asian Formula Renault Challenge drivers
German Formula Three Championship drivers
Australian Formula 3 Championship drivers
Japanese Formula 3 Championship drivers
Formula BMW Asia drivers
Sportspeople from Jakarta
A1 Grand Prix drivers
Jo Zeller Racing drivers
20th-century Indonesian people
21st-century Indonesian people
Performance Racing drivers
Asia Racing Team drivers